Lactura pyronympha is a moth of the family Lacturidae. It was described by Edward Meyrick in 1923. It is found in Papua New Guinea, where it is a common and widely distributed species.

References

Moths described in 1923
Zygaenoidea